Vyšný Žipov is a village and municipality in Vranov nad Topľou District in the Prešov Region of eastern Slovakia.

History
In historical records the village was first mentioned in 1363.

Geography
The municipality lies at an elevation of 155 metres and covers an area of 9.326 km². It has a population of about 1212 people.

External links
 
 
https://web.archive.org/web/20070513023228/http://www.statistics.sk/mosmis/eng/run.html

Villages and municipalities in Vranov nad Topľou District